Vroom is a word that phonetically imitates the sound of an engine revving up. It also may  refer to:

People with the name
 Hendrick Cornelisz Vroom (1566–1640), Dutch painter
 Cornelis Vroom (1591–1661), Dutch painter
 Peter Dumont Vroom (1791–1873), American politician and governor of New Jersey
 Hendrik Vroom (1850–1902), Gold Coast colonial official and businessman
 Frederick Vroom (1857–1942), Canadian silent-film actor
 Victor Vroom (b. 1932), Canadian-American business academic
 Peter Vroom, Australian actor who played Lance Smart in the soap opera Home and Away
 Siem Vroom, Dutch actor who has twice won the Louis d'Or (award)

Arts, entertainment, and media
 "Vroom" (song), a 2018 single by British rapper Yxng Bane
 "Vroum Vroum" (Moha K song), 2021
 Vroom (Transformers), one of the Autobot Mega Pretenders in the Transformers universe
 Vroom (video game), a 1992 game for the Atari ST produced by Lankhor
 Vroom, a 1988 TV film early in the career of English actor Clive Owen
 Vroom, a classified magazine published by Belgian company Mediahuis
 Vroom, a 1997 compilation CD given away by British music magazine Select
 Vroom, a Serbian rock group that followed Ništa Ali Logopedi
 The Vrooms, fictional characters in Driver Dan's Story Train, a British-Arabian children's TV series

Other uses
Vroom & Dreesmann, a Dutch chain of department stores founded in 1887
Vroom Inc., an American e-commerce website for used cars

See also
 Vroom Vroom (disambiguation)
 Varoom (disambiguation)
 Vroom Vroom Vroooom, a 1995 short film directed by Melvin Van Peebles
 Vrooom, an album by King Crimson

Onomatopoeia